The Lujiazui Finance City China Squash Open 2013 is the women's edition of the 2013 China Squash Open, which is a tournament of the WSA World Tour event International (Prize money : 50 000 $). The event took place in Shanghai in China from 24 October to 27 October. Nicol David won her first China Squash Open trophy, beating Raneem El Weleily in the final.

Prize money and ranking points
For 2013, the prize purse was $50,000. The prize money and points breakdown is as follows:

Seeds

Draw and results

See also
WSA World Tour 2013
China Squash Open

References

External links
WSA Lujiazui Finance City China Squash Open 2013 website
Lujiazui Finance City China Open 2013 SquashSite website

Squash tournaments in China
China Squash Open
Squash Open